I Can Cook is a children's television series, that was broadcast on CBeebies, from 4 October 2009 to 25 December 2012. It was presented by Katy Ashworth, who demonstrates how to prepare and cook simple dishes, while entertaining with songs. Each show focuses on the creation of one dish, either savoury or sweet.

As the programme is aimed at children, the dishes are simple to prepare. Some dishes, such as the grape pizza, offer alternatives to traditional dishes.

As well as encouraging children to cook, the show encompasses wider elements of food education; it uses cutaway scenes to show Ashworth in outside locations, explaining the process of cultivating, and growing any key ingredient in the show's dish.

I Can Cook With You
During 2011, the series was branded I Can Cook With You, and featured Katy travelling around the United Kingdom in her own van, to cook in various outdoor locations, and visiting farms and other locations, where food is produced.

I Can Cook on the Go
In 2012, the series was branded I Can Cook on the Go, and features a new revamped van called Horace, and “pinchy parrot”, and wooden spoon puppets. The Special Ingredient, however, was not included in this season.

References

External links

2009 British television series debuts
2015 British television series endings
2000s British children's television series
2000s British cooking television series
2010s British children's television series
2010s British cooking television series
BBC children's television shows
British cooking television shows
British preschool education television series
Television series by Endemol
English-language television shows
CBeebies
2000s preschool education television series
2010s preschool education television series